Eti or legally Eti Food Producing and Trade S.A (Turkish: Eti Gıda Sanayi ve Ticaret A.Ş.) is a Turkish food company that was founded by Firuz Kanatlı in 1962.

History 
Eti was founded in 1962 by Firuz Kanatlı. The company uses the Hittite sun disk as their logo. The name "Eti" is also a synonym for Hittit in Turkish.

In 2003, Kanatlı started "a new era" in production facilities to improve efficiency, which he himself called a "civil war".

During his only interview, Firuz Kanatlı explained that in 1996, the company was required to ask permission and pay taxes to the Gülen movement if they wanted to continue selling their products in Istanbul. The company changed their distributor in the city to avoid the movement.

Since the death of Firuz Kanatlı in October 2017, his son Firuzhan Kanatlı has been the chairman of the company.

The company has 9 production facilities and employs over 7,000 workers.

Products 
Eti's main products are biscuits, cookies, cakes, chocolate, wafers and breakfast food. The company is mainly known for Turkey's first fibrous biscuit Burçak and small-sized cake Eti Popkek. Eti has also started producing milk products in 2014, the company owns milk products such as Süt Burger, Pastamia, Sosbom and Mousse. In total Eti has more 150 types of different products.

On 1 December 2021, Eti changed the name of one of its  products called Negro, a cream-filled chocolate biscuit similar to Oreo, to Nero. According to a statement released by the company, the change was made because the word was "used as an expression of discrimination in some countries." The previous name meant "black" in Spanish, while new one means the same in Italian.

Awards and sponsorships 
Eti won the "Most Loved Companies" awards organized by the Capital magazine in 2013 and 2014 as the most loved chocolate and biscuit company. The company sponsors the TFF League football team Eskişehirspor.

References 

Companies based in Eskişehir
Companies of Turkey
Food and drink companies of Turkey
Companies established in 1962